Johann Faulhaber (5 May 1580 – 10 September 1635) was a German mathematician.

Born in Ulm, Faulhaber was a trained weaver who later took the role of a surveyor of the city of Ulm. He collaborated with Johannes Kepler and Ludolph van Ceulen. Besides his work on the fortifications of cities (notably Basel and Frankfurt), Faulhaber built water wheels in his home town and geometrical instruments for the military. Faulhaber made the first publication of Henry Briggs's Logarithm in Germany. He is also credited with the first printed solution of equal temperament. He died in Ulm.

Faulhaber's major contribution was in calculating the sums of powers of integers. Jacob Bernoulli makes references to Faulhaber in his Ars Conjectandi.

Works

See also
 Faulhaber's formula

References
  SLUB Dresden

External links

 Johann Faulhaber in VD17
 

1580 births
1635 deaths
16th-century German mathematicians
17th-century German mathematicians
Rosicrucians
17th-century German writers
17th-century German male writers